The Beirut derby is the name given in football to any match between cross-city rivals Ansar and Nejmeh. It is considered the biggest club football game in Lebanon.

The derby has historically been the most anticipated game in Lebanon: both located in Beirut, Nejmeh and Ansar have shared the majority of Lebanese Premier League titles. Indeed Ansar holds 14 league titles, the most in the country, and Nejmeh have won eight, the second most.

Ansar leads the head-to-head results in competitive matches with 37 wins to Nejmeh's 34; the two are tied in league wins (22), while Ansar lead in cup wins (15).

History 
Nejmeh and Ansar were both formed in the post-World War II period. Nejmeh, Arabic for "Star", were founded in 1945 in Beirut, shortly after the independence of Lebanon. Ansar, Arabic for "the supporters", were established in 1951 outside Beirut, because the Lebanese capital already had one sports club per 10,000 inhabitants, as designated by the authorities; thus, the club set up in Mount Lebanon to the south of the city. In 1965, as Beirut’s population grew, they switched bases to the capital, establishing a rivalry between the burgundy of Nejmeh and the green of Ansar.

The Beirut Municipal Stadium played host to the inaugural derby game between Nejmeh and Ansar on 8 December 1968, during the first leg of the 1968–69 season. The match was won by Nejmeh 2–1. Saadeddine Berjawi scored the derby's first goal in the 10th minute for Nejmeh, with Ansar's Abdullah Tabash drawing the score in the 23rd minute. Ali Safa scored the winning goal for Nejmeh in the 80th minute. The game was led by the referee Krikor Tchinian.

In the 1997–98 season, the Beirut Municipal Stadium hosted an important derby, with Ansar two points ahead of Nejmeh at the top of the league table. A crowd of 22,000 made their way to the stadium from the early hours of the morning and thousands more gathered outside after tickets were sold out. Ansar won the encounter 4–2, and went on to win their ninth consecutive league title.
On 24 April 2021, the Beirut derby was once again decisive for the fate of the title, as both sides were leading the table, with Ansar having a two-point advantage over Nejmeh. The game, which was played at the Fouad Chehab Stadium in Jounieh, saw Ansar win 2–1 and win the title, in a match that saw nine yellow cards being issued. The two teams had already played each other in the last matchday of the season three times in decisive title-deciding games, in 2005, 2006, and 2008, all ending in draws. Ansar won their first league title since 2007, and their 14th overall, a domestic record. Over 15,000 Ansar fans gathered in front of the Beirut Municipal Stadium to celebrate their team's victory, despite there being preventive measures in place to combat the ongoing COVID-19 pandemic.

Statistics

Records

Biggest wins

Goalscoring

Top goalscorers 
 Players in bold are still active for Ansar or Nejmeh.

Consecutive goalscoring 

 Players in bold are still active for Ansar or Nejmeh.

Most hauls (4 goals) 
 One player has scored a haul (4 goals): Elhadji Malick Tall (Ansar).

Most hat-tricks 
 Two players have scored a hat-trick: Errol McFarlane (Nejmeh) and Salah Rushdy (Nejmeh).

Honours
The rivalry reflected in Beirut derby matches comes about as Ansar and Nejmeh are the most successful football clubs in Lebanon. Ansar leads Nejmeh 39 to 33 in terms of official overall trophies.

See also
 
List of association football rivalries
Football in Lebanon
Nationalism and sport
Religion in football

References

Al Ansar FC
Nejmeh SC
Football rivalries in Lebanon
Politics and sports
Football in Beirut
Recurring sporting events established in 1968
Events at Camille Chamoun Sports City Stadium